The American Senior High School, or The American High School, is a high school located in Country Club, unincorporated Miami-Dade County, Florida. Its principal is Stephen E. Papp. It has been named a Blue Ribbon School of Excellence.

Overview 
American was opened in 1976 (the year of America's bicentennial); its name, sports teams  (Patriots) and colors (red, white, and blue) were chosen to reflect this.

The school uses a Hialeah address but mainly serves northern Miami Lakes, including Palm Springs North and The Country Club of Miami.

American's main athletic rival is Barbara Goleman High School. Other rivals include Hialeah-Miami Lakes High School, Miami Carol City High School, Hialeah High School and Miramar High School.

American is composed of three buildings: the main building which houses most of the classrooms, and the buildings which house the freshman class in order for there to be enough room for the rest of the student body in the main building.

History
At the time the school was built, cow pastures were in the area. It opened with grades 9-11 with 12th added the next year. Its projected initial enrollment was 1,800. Glenda Graham Harris, then one of two women to be principal of a Dade County senior high school, was the initial principal. In December 1976 the school had 1,846 students, with about 33% each Hispanic/Latino, African-American, and non-Hispanic white.

Robert Bork of The Miami Herald wrote that upon opening and by December of that year, American SHS was "troubled by violence". Parents who were non-Latino white organized a boycott in December to show frustration at the violence situation. On Monday December 6, 1976, 791 students, or 42% of the student body, boycotted school. The next day 36% boycotted. By Thursday December 9 the percentage was down to 28%, or about 500 students. The school board assigned two employees to defuse the situation.

Demographics 
American High's student population is 67% Hispanic, 28% Black, 1% Caucasian, and 1% Asian. About 81% of the students receive free or reduced-priced lunch, compared to a district average of 43%. The gender breakdown is 50% male, 50% female.

American feeder pattern 

Middle schools that feed into American include:
 Bob Graham Education Center
 Country Club Middle School
 Lake Stevens Middle School
 Lawton Chiles Middle School
 Mater Gardens Academy Middle
 Miami Lakes Middle School

Elementary schools that feed into American include:
 Charles D. Wyche Elementary
 Joella C. Good Elementary
 Lake Stevens Elementary
 Mater Gardens Academy Elementary
 Palm Springs North Elementary
 Spanish Lake Elementary

Notable alumni 

 Tyrese Cooper – track athlete
 James Jones – former professional basketball player and 3x champion for the Miami Heat and Cleveland Cavaliers currently the vice president of basketball operations for the Phoenix Suns. Played collegiately at the University of Miami
 Dascha Polanco - American Dominican actress
 Darnell Sweeney - professional baseball player
 Olivier Vernon – professional football player, New York Giants, played collegiately at the University of Miami
 Darryl Williams – defensive back, Cincinnati Bengals (1992–1995, 2000–2001), Seattle Seahawks (1996–1998), played collegiately at the University of Miami
 Smokepurpp - Rapper

References

External links 

 
 
 Miami-Dade County public schools

Educational institutions established in 1976
Miami-Dade County Public Schools high schools
1976 establishments in Florida
High schools in Florida
Schools in Florida